The Hunters is a 2011 French crime horror thriller film directed by Chris Briant. The film was produced by Antoine Huet,
Thomas Malmonte, Donato Rotunno, Joseph Rouschop. It stars Dianna Agron, Steven Waddington and Tony Becker. It was released in limited theaters on December 27, 2011.

Plot
On the outskirts of town is a large abandoned fort turned wooded park. Detective Le Saint is an ex-soldier assigned to protect a police informant who he arranges to meet at an abandoned fort in the woods. Alice is a college student who sneaks into the fort with a friend to go exploring. Unfortunately, the fort is also used by a group of men as a base for hunting humans: vagrants, tourists, and anyone else who happens to stray too far into the woods or stay after the park closes. Now Le Saint and Alice are caught up in the hunt against men who see humans as their next prey.

Production
The film, while hosting an array of American actors, was filmed in Luxembourg and France.

Cast

 Dianna Agron as Alice
 Chris Briant as Le Saint
 Steven Waddington as Ronny
 Tony Becker as Oliver Sheribow
 Terence Knox as Bernard
 Jay Brown as Stephen
 Xavier Delambre as William Icham
 Philip Correia as David
 Laurent Barbier as François
 Philippe Beauvais as Cyclist
 Sascha Migge as Security Agent
 Daniel Plier as Dan Darrish
 Thomas Sanne as Sam
 Gintare Parulyte as Bernard's Secretary
 Alex Adam as Peter
 Mireille De Kerleau as Ann
 Corinne Pilutti as Beth
 Loreta Fishta	as Le Saint's Ex
 Sophie Pop as Sondra

Release
The film had limited theatrical release on December 27, 2011. It was released on DVD February 19, 2012.

References

External links
 

2011 films
2011 horror films
French horror thriller films
Films scored by Mark Snow
Films about hunters
Films shot in France
Films shot in Luxembourg
English-language French films
2010s English-language films
2010s French films
Luxembourgian horror thriller films
Belgian horror thriller films